Beighton Fields is a village in Derbyshire, England, UK, near Renishaw and Staveley (where the population is listed).

John Bruno Bowdon, of Southgate House and Beighton Fields, who married Mary Martha, eldest daughter of Edward Ferrers, Esq., of Baddesley Clinton, in Warwickshire was High Sheriff of Derbyshire in 1841.

See also
Geograph image of Beighton Fields
List of places in Derbyshire

References

External links

Villages in Derbyshire
Chesterfield, Derbyshire